Andreas Hedwig (born in 1959) is a German archivist and since 2014 the head of the Hessian State Archive.

Life 
He then received his doctorate in 1989. In 1990/91 he was Research Assistant at the University of Bremen. Between 1991 and 1993 he completed a referendariat. Hedwig was appointed honorary professor at the University of Marburg in 2016. The appointment as President of the Hessian State Archive followed in April 2018.

Publications 
 Studien zum Polyptychon von Saint-Germain-des-Prés. Böhlau, Cologne/Weimar/Wien 1993 [together with Konrad Elmshäuser], .
 (ed.) Napoleon und das Königreich Westphalen. Herrschaftssystem und Modellstaatspolitik. Historische Kommission für Hessen, Marburg 2008 [together with Klaus Malettke and Karl Murk], .
 (ed.) Adelsarchive. Zentrale Quellenbestände oder Curiosa?. Hessisches Staatsarchiv Marburg, Marburg 2009 [together with Karl Murk, .
 (ed.) Die Verfolgung der Juden während der NS-Zeit. Stand und Perspektiven der Dokumentation, der Vermittlung und der Erinnerung. Historische Kommission für Hessen, Marburg 2011, .
 (ed.) Die Brüder Grimm in Marburg. Hessisches Staatsarchiv Marburg, Marburg 2013, .
 (ed.) Finanzpolitik und Schuldenkrisen 16.-20. Jahrhundert. Historische Kommission für Hessen, Marburg 2014, .
 (ed.) Bündnisse und Friedensschlüsse in Hessen. Aspekte friedenssichernder und friedensstiftender Politik der Landgrafschaft Hessen im Mittelalter und in der Neuzeit. Historische Kommission für Hessen, Marburg 2016, .
 (ed.) Zeitenwende in Hessen. Revolutionärer Aufbruch 1918/1919 in die Demokratie. Hessisches Staatsarchiv Marburg, Marburg 2019, .

References

External links 
 

1959 births
Living people
People from Leverkusen
German archivists
Academic staff of the University of Marburg